The 2021 La Paz gubernatorial election was held on Sunday, 7 March 2021, with a runoff taking place on 11 April 2021, involving separate contests for governor and all forty-five seats in the Departmental Legislative Assembly. Incumbent governor Félix Patzi unsuccessfully sought reelection to a second term, finishing in fourth place with 4.36 percent of the popular vote. The election was won by Jallalla La Paz's Santos Quispe—son of the deceased Felipe Quispe, Jallalla's original candidate—who attained 55.23 percent of the vote in the second round, defeating Franklin Flores of the Movement for Socialism. On the legislative ballot, the Movement for Socialism won sixteen of the twenty provincial circumscriptions and nine of the twenty plurinominal seats, retaining its twenty-five seat majority in the Legislative Assembly.

Background and electoral system 
In the 2015 gubernatorial election, former minister of education Félix Patzi of the Third System Movement (MTS), running in alliance with Sovereignty and Liberty (SOL.bo), successfully won the governorship in the first round by a margin of 50.09 percent of the popular vote to his closest competitor's 30.68 percent, dislodging the ruling Movement for Socialism (MAS-IPSP) from power. Despite its defeat in the governorship, the MAS retained its effective majority in the Departmental Legislative Assembly. As with other departmental, provincial, and municipal elected officials, Patzi and the Legislative Assembly's set term of office was due to expire in mid-2020, completing a five-year mandate started in 2015. However, due to the annulment of the 2019 general election results as an outcome of that year's political crisis, the terms of all subnational authorities were extended until after new national elections had taken place. 

The Supreme Electoral Tribunal (TSE) issued the call for subnational elections on 10 November 2020, scheduling them to be held on 7 March 2021. Individuals aged 18 by the election date or who had recently changed residency could register to vote between 3 and 17 December. 28 December was set as the deadline for political organizations to register their candidacies. For all nine autonomous departments, the electoral system has been in continuous use since 2010, involving separate contests for governor as the executive authority and all seats in the legislative body, known as the Departmental Legislative Assembly. All governorships are elected by simple majority in a two-round system, with the top two candidates moving to a runoff if none of the contending parties attains fifty percent of the vote. Additionally, a second round may be avoided if one candidate achieves a forty percent plurality with ten percent more votes than the next closest competitor.

Twenty seats in the Legislative Assembly are elected in provincial uninominal circumscriptions (assembly members by territory), while the other twenty are elected on an electoral list in a single department-wide plurinominal circumscription (assembly members by population), allocated proportionally using the D'Hondt method. The remaining five seats are reserved for the department's indigenous nations, appointed or elected by indigenous authorities in accordance with usos y costumbres.

Candidates and campaigns

Jallalla La Paz 
In mid-November, Felipe Quispe, popularly known as "El Mallku", launched his gubernatorial candidacy. The former guerilla and trade union leader had previously contested 2015's gubernatorial race on behalf of the Movement for Sovereignty (MPS), which this time opted to run university professor Federico Zelada as its candidate. Though Quispe was a member of his own front, Forward United People (APU)—led by his son, Santos Quispe—the party lacked legal registration, leading him to seek out an authorized organization willing to lend him its acronym. In December, Santos Quispe sealed an alliance between APU and Jallalla La Paz of Leopoldo Chui, which agreed to nominate his father as its candidate.

Quispe quickly established himself as an early frontrunner in the opening weeks of the campaign, with Ciesmori's first opinion poll published in late January giving him a quarter of the popular vote, trailed by a multitude of opposing candidates. By the time that poll was released, however, Quispe's prospects of attaining the governorship had been severely hampered, given that he was dead, having suffered from cardiac arrest a week prior. The Mallku's demise immediately put into question the electoral future of Jallalla, which was forced to seek an alternative candidate. Within a day of Quispe's death, his son, Santos, moved to "inherit" his father's candidacy, with APU's leadership announcing that it had selected him as the party's new nominee. Jallalla formally accepted the change on 2 February, following a meeting between representatives from all seventy-eight municipalities in which the organization had a presence.

Movement for Socialism 
Within the Movement for Socialism, the candidate selection process operates under the framework of pluralism. Local party branches and affiliated social organizations are tasked with selecting pre-candidates, who are then evaluated by the party's leadership. The official nomination is a choice made solely by party leaders, together with allied social organizations. Just two prominent political leaders were presented as pre-candidates for the nomination. The first was Franklin Flores, a former member of the Chamber of Deputies, who was proclaimed by several agrarian workers' unions in his home province of Aroma, in addition to receiving the support of the Túpac Katari Peasant Federation. The second was Beimar Calep Mamani, the outgoing mayor of Palos Blancos, who enjoyed support from the Federation of Intercultural Communities of La Paz as well as various agrarian unions in the north of the department.

Early into the internal primary process, Flores established himself as the favorite to win the nomination, enjoying the support of party leader Evo Morales. The former president announced that Flores had been designated as the MAS's candidate on 14 December, a position officialized two weeks later. According to Morales, Flores' selection had been reached "almost by consensus", a point denied by Mamani and the Intercultural Federation, with the former contending that Morales had been misinformed into believing that Flores was the only candidate in the running. The dispute led Página Siete to later describe Flores as having been "chosen by Evo", a point he denied, pointing out that over 2,000 local communities had backed him before he won Morales' endorsement.

Somos Pueblo 
Of the major gubernatorial candidates, Rafael Quispe had been in the race the longest, having established himself as a contender years in advance. Quispe's gubernatorial aspirations stemmed as far back as 2014 when he unsuccessfully sought the National Unity Front's nomination to contest the 2015 gubernatorial election. Since then, the former deputy and former head of the Indigenous Development Fund had worked on structuring his own political organization, touring the department's rural areas with a view toward gaining support to seek the governorship. In late 2018, he joined Venceremos, a newly legally registered civic group led by El Alto Municipal Councillor Óscar Huanca. Reports at the time indicated that the group had selected Quispe as its gubernatorial candidate. By 2019, however, Quispe appeared to have moved away from Huanca, having instead founded his own political organization, Somos Pueblo. Venceremos, in turn, opted instead to nominate Juan Choque, Felipe Quispe's son-in-law, as its candidate.

Quispe formally launched his gubernatorial campaign in September 2019, signing an alliance between Somos Pueblo and the Social Democratic Movement (MDS) to form Somos Pueblo Demócrata, a coalition that also included New Social Option (NOS), a small local party. As a result of the year-long delay in holding subnational elections, Quispe shelved his plans, relaunching the campaign in early November 2020. For this run, Quispe joined forces with Iván Arias to form For the Common Good – Somos Pueblo (PBCSP), an alliance between their two political organizations. As both fronts lacked legal registration, the MDS again sponsored the alliance, joined this time by Suma Escoma. Arias and Quispe jointly officialized their candidacies for mayor and governor, respectively, on 28 December.

Third System Movement 
For incumbent governor Félix Patzi—whose party, the MTS, had attained legal registration since becoming governor—the question of whether he would seek reelection remained pendant until the final weeks preceding candidate registration. Patzi's most recent electoral endeavor had been his 2019 bid for the presidency, in which he attained a meager 3.18 percent in his home department. In addition, Patzi's poor handling of the COVID-19 pandemic left much to be desired, leaving him vulnerable in a future second-term bid. Given these concerns, on 5 December, the MTS held a party conference to define whether or not Patzi would seek reelection. The meeting, attended by party partisans and allied social organizations, concluded that Patzi's reelection was "necessary" in order to continue the public works projects initiated during his first term.

Other political organizations 
This election was noted for the high degree of indigenous representation on the ballot, with a majority of gubernatorial candidates being of some indigenous descent. According to analyst Marcelo Arequipa, the prevalence of indigenous candidates reflected the shifting voting demographics in the department. For the first time, the Aymara city of El Alto and not the capital of La Paz enjoyed a majority of registered voters, making it, together with the provinces, key to winning the election. Apart from the top four contenders—all ethnic Aymara—indigenous candidates running with minor fronts included Beatriz Álvarez. A chola Aymara, Álvarez had served as a La Paz municipal councillor on behalf of Sovereignty and Liberty (SOL.bo), the party that nominated her to seek the governorship. Of the fourteen candidates, only Álvarez and one other individual—Assemblywoman Claudia Bravo of the National Unity Front (UN)—were women.

Other candidates included Franclin Gutiérrez, who was invited to run by the Front for Victory (FPV). The cocalero activist had led the Departmental Association of Coca Producers (ADEPCOCA) and was noted for having been arrested during the Morales administration, spending fifteen months in preventative detention on dubious charges that were dropped in 2019. On behalf of Civic Community — Autonomies (C-A), Samuel Sea was presented as a candidate for the governorship. In the 2020 elections, Sea had been a candidate for deputy in La Paz's circumscription 16 and was the alliance's coordinator in the provinces. As with Felipe Quispe, Sea's candidacy was cut short after he died from complications related to COVID-19. Sea was replaced on the ballot by Mateo Laura, who had previously governed La Paz as prefect—the precursor to governor—between 2002 and 2003.

General election

Opinion polling

Results 

The death of Felipe Quispe significantly shifted the competitive nature of the campaign. Speaking to Página Siete, Rafael Quispe predicted that the Mallku's departure would serve to aid the candidates in second and third place; that is, Flores and himself. "The MAS supporters who were going to vote for the Mallku will return to the MAS, and the people who were going to vote for the Mallku because he was against the MAS will return to Rafael", Quispe stated. By 11 February, Ciesmori's second opinion poll found that the "posthumous vote" had not significantly carried over to Santos Quispe, who moved down to second place, putting Flores in the lead. Flores maintained his slight edger over the opposition candidates for the remainder of the race, though not by a high enough percentage to circumvent a runoff, even when calculating the results without taking the undecided and null vote into account.

By election night, however, exit polling conducted by Ciesmori and Focaliza indicated a surge in MAS support, granting Flores nearly forty percent of the vote with an over ten-point lead above his closest competitor. The margin was substantial enough for Red UNO to call the race for Flores, believing that with the remaining votes, he would be able to avoid a second round. With that, Flores himself declared victory, as did Morales. For his part, Santos Quispe decried fraud, alleging irregularities in the vote counting process, for which his supporters installed vigils outside the Departmental Electoral Tribunal (TED)'s facilities. In the ensuing days, the ongoing vote count narrowed the race, placing Flores' victory in uncertainty. A week after the election, the TED released its final tabulation, giving Flores 39.7 percent of the first round vote, leaving him just three-tenths of a percent shy of winning the governorship outright and setting off a runoff in the department.

With the second round underway, both Flores and Quispe went about shoring up their bases of support in the department, with Flores seeking to solidify the MAS vote in the provinces while Quispe campaigned in the capital. Both contenders also sought out alliances with other parties, with Flores attaining the support of the Bolivian National Action Party (PAN-BOL) and, more importantly, the MTS of outgoing governor Félix Patzi. According to analysts, Flores' main obstacle in reaching the governorship was surviving the vote in the city of La Paz, the only municipality that had not been won by either of the top two contenders, having lent its support to Rafael Quispe. For his part, Quispe expressed his dissatisfaction with both candidates, considering them "the same" and announcing his intent to vote null. His party, Somos Pueblo, similarly refused to endorse either the MAS or JALLALLA, encouraging supporters to make their own choice. For columnist José Luis Quiroga, Flores' chances of winning relied on whether voters in the capital switched their support to Santos Quispe—which was not a given—or opted instead to sit out the runoff.

Ultimately, a majority of voters in the second round broke for Quispe, who defeated Flores by a margin of 55.23 percent to Flores' 44.77. Though voting was repeated on 25 April at four polling centers in El Alto and La Paz, the results, constituting 00.04 percent of the total vote, did not sway the election. Quispe was formally accredited as governor-elect by the TED on 28 April. Within hours of receiving his credentials, Quispe broke his pact with Jallalla, announcing his intent to solidify APU as a political force. The governor-elect's actions led Chui to denounce him as a "traitor", and Quispe was formally expelled from Jallalla on 10 May, seven days after his formal inauguration as governor.

References

Notes

Footnotes

Bibliography 

 
 

La Paz
La Paz gubernatorial